The GM M platform was the designation used by General Motors for the platform that underpinned the first, second and third generation Suzuki Cultus and its offspring.

The first generation of this platform had been designed by Suzuki for their 1983 Cultus, and adopted by Chevrolet with the introduction of the Sprint.

The platforms of the second and third generations first appeared in 1989 and 1995 respectively.  They were designed at GM's Technical Center in Warren, Michigan, USA.  Suzuki designed all the engines, drivetrains and actual body. From 1985 through 1989, all models were imported from Suzuki's facilities in Hamamatsu, Japan. From 1990 on, some North American M-cars were produced at CAMI Automotive in Ingersoll, Ontario, Canada with the exception of the convertible and turbocharged models which were imported from Japan.  The third generation M platform was only sold by Suzuki as the Suzuki Swift in North America as Suzuki decided to create their own Swift to market around the world.

The following vehicles used this platform:
Suzuki Cultus Generations I and II, GM M platform:

2= 2-dr convertible
3= 3-dr hatchback
4= 4-dr sedan
5= 5-dr hatchback
un = unknown
a. Manufactured at Magyar Suzuki
b. Imported to Colombia
c. Geo branded models in US after 1989, in Canada after 1992
d. MF, MH: only generations of 'Cultus-derived' Barina
e. Justy JMA/MS, manufactured at Magyar Suzuki
f. Manufactured at Paksuzuki

Suzuki Cultus Generation III, GM M platform:

3 = 3-dr hatchback
4 = 4-dr sedan
5 = 5-dr hatchback

GM also used a different M platform for its rear-wheel drive minivans, the Chevrolet Astro and the GMC Safari.

See also
 GM platforms

M